Sam-Son Farm is a Thoroughbred horse racing stable with farms located in Milton, Ontario, Canada and Ocala, Florida. Originating in the 60's by Ernie Samuel, it began as a home for competition hunter/jumper horses. One Sam-Son horse, Canadian Club won the 1967 Pan-American Games Individual Jumping Gold medal and was a member of the 1968 Team Gold Medal for Canada at the Mexico Olympics ridden by Jim Day. Sam-Son continued to send entries to International show jumping, dressage and three ay venting events including the 1972 and 1976 Olympics and thereafter. In 1971 it became home to its first Thoroughbred race horse and officially entered racing in 1972.

Sam-Son Farm is a five-time winner of the Queen's Plate, Canada's most important horse race, and a record seven Woodbine Oaks. In 1991,  the stable won the Eclipse Award for Outstanding Owner after its horses established a new world record for race earnings. Under trainers Jim Day, and then Mark Frostad who took over in 1995, Sam-Son Farm has won ten Sovereign Awards for outstanding owner and eight for outstanding breeder. Current Trainer is Malcolm Pierce.

Both Ernie Samuel and Tammy Samuel-Balaz have been inducted into the Canadian Horse Racing Hall of Fame as were Sam-Son Trainers, Day and Frostad. Nine Sam-Son horses have been inducted into the Hall of Fame including Dance Smartly, No Class, Sky Classic, Chief Bearhart, Classy ’n Smart, Smart Strike, Wilderness Song, Dancethruthedawn and most recently, Soaring Free in 2013.

Some of their notable Thoroughbred racehorses include:
Chief Bearhart - won the 1997 Breeders' Cup Turf and was named the Eclipse Award for Outstanding Male Turf Horse and a two-time Canadian Horse of the Year;
Classy 'n Smart - Canadian Champion 3-Year-Old Filly (1984), Canadian Broodmare of the Year (1991), Canadian Horse Racing Hall of Fame. Dam of Dance Smartly and Smart Strike
Dance Smartly - undefeated in the 1991 racing season, en route to winning the Breeders' Cup Distaff,  she became the only filly to ever win the Canadian Triple Crown. She won the Eclipse Award for Outstanding Three-Year-Old Filly in North America and in 2003 was inducted into the National Museum of Racing and Hall of Fame;
Dancethruthedawn - won the 2001 Queens' Plate and the Grade 1 Go For Wand Handicap at Saratoga Race Course
Regal Classic – Canadian Champion Two-Year-Old Colt
Sky Classic - Canadian Champion Two-Year-Old Colt (1989), Canadian Champion Male Turf Horse, Canadian Champion Older Male Horse (1991), and the Eclipse Award in the United States for American Champion Male Turf Horse (1992)
Smart Strike - multiple Graded stakes race winner, Leading sire in North America (2007, 2008), sire of Curlin and English Channel.
Up With The Birds - Graded Stakes Race Grade 1 winner, 2013 Canadian Horse of the Year.

Sam-Son Farm has owned nine horses who were voted Canadian Horse of the Year honours: Dauphin Fabuleux (1984), Imperial Choice (1985), Ruling Angel (1985), Dance Smartly (1991), Chief Bearhart (1997-'98), Quiet Resolve (2000) and Soaring Free (2004), Up With The Birds (2013).

The business uses the Milton, Ontario farm as a broodmare installation and maintains a training facility in Ocala, Florida

Sam-Son Grade 1 Stakes winner, Smart Strike went on to even greater fame as a Stallion. Standing at Lane's End Farm in Versailles, Kentucky, Smart Strike was twice honoured as North America's leading Thoroughbred Sire. Smart Strike died on March 25, 2015. At that time he was already the sire of 113 stakes winners, 12 champions, four Breeders' Cup winners, and two Classic victors.

Following the death of Sam-Son Farm's founder in 2000, farm operations were taken over by his daughter Tammy Samuel-Balaz and lasting until her death from cancer in 2008, at age forty-seven. Management for the business was then transferred to her husband and brother, with Rick Balaz in the role of President and Mark Samuel as CEO. Ownership of Sam-Son Farm belongs to the Samuel-Balaz Family, consisting of Rick Balaz, Mark Samuel, and Kim Samuel.

External links
 Sam-Son Farm

Canadian racehorse owners and breeders
Horse farms in Canada
Eclipse Award winners
Sovereign Award winners
Milton, Ontario
Owners of King's Plate winners